"You Make the Whole World Smile" is a single by New Zealand singer/songwriter, Hammond Gamble, as part of the Red Nose Band, called "Hammond Gamble & The Red Nose Gang".

The song was the theme song for television adverts for Red Nose Day.  The music video featured many famous New Zealanders lipsynching to the song in black and white.

This local tune has the distinction of being the only song in the New Zealand charts to ever hit number one twice in separate years. "You Make the Whole World Smile" first hit number one in August 1992 and exactly a year later it was number one again after having dropped out of the chart completely. It also was the only New Zealand song to reach number one in the two years.
The song was also notable for knocking the song "Can't Help Falling in Love" by UB40 out of the number 1 spot it had held for 10 weeks, the UB40 song returned to number 1 the following week.

Charts

Year-end charts

Anika Moa cover
Anika Moa released a charity cover of the song in November 2010 as to fundraise for Cure Kids as part of Red Nose Day.

References

Number-one singles in New Zealand
New Zealand songs
1991 singles
1992 singles
1991 songs